George Louis Chatterton (16 January 1916 – 9 July 1983) was a Progressive Conservative party member of the House of Commons of Canada. He was an agrologist by career.

He was first elected at the Esquimalt—Saanich riding in a 29 May 1961 by-election, then elected for a full term in Parliament there in the 1962 federal election. After two further re-elections in 1963 and 1965, Chatterton was defeated by David Anderson of the Liberal party in the 1968 election.

References

External links
 

1916 births
1983 deaths
Members of the House of Commons of Canada from British Columbia
Progressive Conservative Party of Canada MPs
South African emigrants to Canada